Puvirnituq Airport  is located  north of Puvirnituq, Quebec, Canada.

Airlines and destinations

References

External links

Certified airports in Nord-du-Québec